Krylovskaya is a rural locality (a stanitsa) and the administrative center of Krylovsky District in Krasnodar Krai, Russia, located on the Yeya River. Population:

References

Rural localities in Krasnodar Krai
Kuban Oblast